2956 Yeomans, provisional designation , is a stony asteroid from the central regions of the asteroid belt, approximately 10 kilometers in diameter. It was discovered on 28 April 1982, by astronomer Edward Bowell at the Anderson Mesa Station of the Lowell Observatory in near Flagstaff, Arizona. It was named after American astronomer Donald Keith Yeomans.

Orbit and classification 

Yeomans is a non-family asteroid from the asteroid belt's background population. It orbits the Sun in the central main-belt at a distance of 2.5–3.0 AU once every 4 years and 7 months (1,679 days). Its orbit has an eccentricity of 0.09 and an inclination of 3° with respect to the ecliptic.

Physical characteristics 

In the SMASS classification, Yeomans is an Sr-subtype that transitions from the stony S-types to the uncommon R-type asteroids.

Rotation period 

In April 2014, a rotational lightcurve of Yeomans was obtained from photometric observations made at the Isaac Aznar Observatory in Spain. Lightcurve analysis gave a rotation period of 3.4 hours with a brightness variation of 0.28 magnitude. A similar period of 3.509 hours with an amplitude of 0.24 magnitude was found by astronomers at the Palomar Transient Factory in October 2011.

Diameter and albedo 

According to the survey carried out by the NEOWISE mission of NASA's Wide-field Infrared Survey Explorer, Yeomans measures 9.350 kilometers in diameter and its surface has an albedo of 0.292. The Collaborative Asteroid Lightcurve Link assumes a standard albedo for stony asteroids of 0.20 and derives a diameter of 11.30 kilometers based on an absolute magnitude of 12.1.

Naming 

This minor planet was named after American astronomer Donald Keith Yeomans, a celestial mechanician at JPL and astrometry-expert of the International Halley Watch. The official naming citation was published by the Minor Planet Center on 18 September 1986.

In popular culture 

 In the 1995 Sliders first-season episode "Last Days", asteroid 2956 Yeomans (misspelled Yeoman in the episode) was the asteroid responsible for almost destroying the Earth by impact.

References

External links 
 Asteroid Lightcurve Database (LCDB), query form (info )
 APT Asteroid Photometric Survey, query form
 Dictionary of Minor Planet Names, Google books
 Asteroids and comets rotation curves, CdR – Observatoire de Genève, Raoul Behrend
 Discovery Circumstances: Numbered Minor Planets (1)-(5000) – Minor Planet Center
 
 

002956
Discoveries by Edward L. G. Bowell
Named minor planets
002956
19820428